John Oxley (1784–1828) was an explorer and surveyor of Australia.

John Oxley may also refer to:

People
John Norton Oxley (1824–1891), Australian farmer and politician
John Oxley (long jumper) (1881–1925), American track and field athlete
John T. Oxley (polo) (1909–1996), American businessman and polo player
John C. Oxley (born 1937), American oilman, horse breeder and polo player
John Oxley (cricketer) (1850–1917), English cricketer
Johnny Oxley (1922-1976), British ice hockey player

Other
SS John Oxley, pilot boat, built 1927

Oxley, John